Events in the year 2007 in Spain.

Incumbents
 Monarch: Juan Carlos I
 Prime Minister: José Luis Rodríguez Zapatero

Events
 February 12: Iberian Peninsula earthquake
 February 18: Andalusian constitutional referendum
 May 27: Spanish regional elections, elections to the Aragonese Corts, elections to the Corts Valencianes
 MV New Flame

Arts and entertainment
In film, Solitary Fragments by Jaime Rosales won the Best film award at the Goya Awards. For a list of Spanish films released in 2007 see Spanish films of 2007.

In music, D'Nash with I Love You Mi Vida were the Spanish entry in the Eurovision Song Contest. Violadores del Verso won the award for Best Spanish Act at the MTV Europe Music Awards.

Sports
In auto racing, Felipe Massa won the Formula One Spanish Grand Prix. Bruno Senna won the feature race and Timo Glock won the sprint race at the Spanish GP2 round. For other events see: 1000km of Valencia and the Spanish Formula Three season.
In basketball, Spain hosted the EuroBasket won by Russia with Spain second. Real Madrid won the ACB season finals and Winterthur Barcelona won the Copa del Rey de Baloncesto.
In cycling, Denis Menchov won the Vuelta a España. Spain hosted the UCI Track Cycling World Championships. For other events see: Tour of the Basque Country, Volta a Catalunya, Volta a Lleida and Clásica de San Sebastián.
In football (soccer), Real Madrid won La Liga and Real Valladolid won the Segunda División.
In tennis, Meghann Shaughnessy won the singles and Nuria Llagostera Vives and Arantxa Parra Santonja won the couples at the Barcelona KIA.
Events in other sports: Spanish International Badminton Tournament (badminton), Nestea European Championship Final (beach volleyball), Figure skating at the 2007 European Youth Olympic Festival (figure skating), Valencia Superbike World Championship round (motorcycle racing) and America's Cup (sailing).

Births
 April 29: Infanta Sofía of Spain, second child of Felipe, Prince of Asturias and Princess Letizia

Deaths
 April 22: Francisco Rodríguez Pascual, Spanish humanist and anthropologist (b. 1927)
 May 9: Mauro Galindo, Spanish dancer, choreographer and instructor (b. 1958)
 August 28: Antonio Puerta, footballer (b. 1984)

See also
 2007 in Spanish television
 List of Spanish films of 2007

References

 
Spain
Years of the 21st century in Spain
2000s in Spain
Spain